Rajan Pavlovic (born 17 August 1976) is an Australian handball player. He competed in the men's tournament at the 2000 Summer Olympics.

References

1976 births
Living people
Australian male handball players
Olympic handball players of Australia
Handball players at the 2000 Summer Olympics
People from Doboj